The Karachi Cantonment is a cantonment town of the city of Karachi, in Sindh, Pakistan.

History 
It serves as a military base and residential establishment. It was established by the British Indian Army in August 1942, and taken over by the Pakistan Army in 1947. The cantonment maintains sewerage, sanitation, roads, buildings control, transfer of immoveable properties, death, birth and marriage record of the respective area.

Railway Station 
The biggest and busiest railway station of Pakistan, Karachi Cantonment railway station, is also located here.

Dumlottee Wells 
Wells were dug and built near the river at Dumlottee in 1881, which supplied five million gallons of water to Karachi Cantonment every day. Dumlottee wells were designed and built by British engineers Temple and Currie in 1882.

Boundaries 

 North: Garden Area
 South: Karachi Cantonment railway station
 East: FTC Bridge
 West: Arts Council of Pakistan, Sindh Assembly Building

Landmarks
 Karachi Cantonment Railway Station
 Muhammad Ali Jinnah Road
 Shara-e-Faisal
 Finance and Trade Centre
 Fleet Club
 Services Club
 St. Anthony’s Church

See also
 Army Cantonment Board, Pakistan
 Cantonment

References

External links
 

Cantonments in Karachi
Cantonments of Pakistan